The list below includes all entities falling even partially under any of the various common definitions of Europe, geographical or political. Fifty generally recognised sovereign states, Kosovo with limited, but substantial, international recognition, and seven largely unrecognised de facto states with limited to no recognition have territory in Europe and/or membership in international European organisations. There are eight entities that are not integral parts of a European state or have special political arrangements.

Boundary of Europe

Geographical

Under the commonly used geographic definition, the boundary between the continents of Asia and Europe stretches along the Ural Mountains, the Ural River, and the Caspian Sea in the east, the Greater Caucasus range, and the Black Sea with its outlets, the Bosporus and the Dardanelles, in the south. Based on such a commonly used division of the continents, the transcontinental countries of Azerbaijan, Georgia, Kazakhstan, Russia, and Turkey have territory in both Asia and Europe.

The island of Cyprus in Western Asia is close to Anatolia (or Asia Minor) but is often considered to be a part of Europe and is a current member of the European Union. Like Cyprus, Armenia is also entirely in Western Asia but is a member of several European organisations.

Although the Mediterranean Sea provides a clearer divide between Africa and Europe, some traditionally European islands such as Malta, Pantelleria, the Pelagie Islands, and Sicily are actually located on the African Plate. The island of Iceland is part of the Mid-Atlantic Ridge, straddling the Eurasian Plate and the North American Plate.

Some territories which are geographically outside of Europe have strong connections with European states. Greenland, for example, has socio-political connections with Europe and is part of the Kingdom of Denmark but is located closer to the continent of North America and is usually grouped with that continent.

Other territories are part of European countries but are geographically located on other continents, such as the French overseas regions, the Spanish autonomous cities of Ceuta and Melilla on the coast of Africa, and the Dutch BES islands of Bonaire, Sint Eustatius, and Saba in the Caribbean.

Political

The political boundaries of Europe vary with the definition of Europe that is used by different political organizations. For instance, the Council of Europe and the European Court of Human Rights include 47 countries in their definition of Europe. The European Higher Education Area includes 48 countries, and the European Cultural Convention and the European Olympic Committees include 50 countries in their definitions.

Sovereign states

A sovereign state is a political association with effective sovereignty over a population for whom it makes decisions in the national interest. According to the Montevideo Convention, a state must have a permanent population, a defined territory, a government, and the capacity to enter into relations with other states.

UN member states and UNGA non-member observer state 
There are 50 sovereign states with territory located within the common definition of Europe and/or membership in international European organisations that are almost universally recognized internationally. All are either member states of the United Nations or non-member observer states at the United Nations General Assembly (UNGA), and all except Belarus, Kazakhstan, Russia, and Vatican City are members of the Council of Europe. 44 countries have their capital city located within Europe, and (as of 2022) 27 of those countries are member states of the European Union, which means that they are highly integrated with one another and share their sovereignty through EU institutions.

Each entry in the list below has a map of its location in Europe. Territory in Europe is shown in dark-green; territory not geographically in Europe is shown in a lighter shade of green. The lightest shade of green represents other states in the EU and is shown on the maps of all territories within the EU.

De facto states 
The following six entities in Europe have partial diplomatic recognition by one or more UN member states (and therefore are defined as states by the constitutive theory of statehood) or have no diplomatic recognition by any UN member state but are defined as states by the declarative theory of statehood. None are members of the UN, Council of Europe or EU.

Non-sovereign territories

Dependent territories 
The following six European entities are dependent territories.

Areas of special sovereignty 
The following places are considered integral parts of their sovereign state, but have a political arrangement that was decided through an international agreement.

See also
 International organisations in Europe
 Lists of European countries:
 by area
 by GDP
 by GDP per capita
 by GDP PPP
 by population
 List of former sovereign states in Europe
 Predecessors of sovereign states in Europe
 Regions of Europe
 Timeline of European nations

Notes

References

Lists of countries by continent
01
Sovereign states and dependent territories
Europe